Nguyễn Hoàng Phi Vũ (born 27 June 1999) is a Vietnamese archer. He competed in the men's individual event at the 2020 Summer Olympics.

References

External links
 

1999 births
Living people
People from Hải Dương province
Vietnamese male archers
Olympic archers of Vietnam
Archers at the 2020 Summer Olympics
Place of birth missing (living people)